Dash Bolagh-e Kharabeh Galak (also Romanized as Dāsh Bolāgh-e Kharābeh Galak; also known as Dāsh Bolāgh-e Kharābeh Kalak) is a village in Nazarkahrizi Rural District, Nazarkahrizi District, Hashtrud County, East Azerbaijan Province, Iran. At the 2006 census, its population was 320, in 61 families.

References 

Towns and villages in Hashtrud County